In enzymology, an isoleucine—tRNA ligase is an enzyme that catalyzes the chemical reaction

ATP + L-isoleucine + tRNAIle  AMP + diphosphate + L-isoleucyl-tRNAIle

The 3 substrates of this enzyme are ATP, L-isoleucine, and tRNA(Ile), whereas its 3 products are AMP, diphosphate, and L-isoleucyl-tRNA(Ile).

This enzyme belongs to the family of ligases, to be specific those forming carbon-oxygen bonds in aminoacyl-tRNA and related compounds.  The systematic name of this enzyme class is L-isoleucine:tRNAIle ligase (AMP-forming). Other names in common use include isoleucyl-tRNA synthetase, isoleucyl-transfer ribonucleate synthetase, isoleucyl-transfer RNA synthetase, isoleucine-transfer RNA ligase, isoleucine-tRNA synthetase, and isoleucine translase.  This enzyme participates in valine, leucine and isoleucine biosynthesis and aminoacyl-trna biosynthesis.

Structural studies

References

 
 
 

EC 6.1.1
Enzymes of known structure